The 1996 Skoda Czech Open was a men's tennis tournament played on outdoor clay courts at the I. Czech Lawn Tennis Club in Prague, Czech Republic and was part of the World Series of the 1996 ATP Tour. It was the tenth edition of the tournament and ran from 29 April until 5 May 1996. Second-seeded Yevgeny Kafelnikov won the singles title.

Finals

Singles

 Yevgeny Kafelnikov defeated  Bohdan Ulihrach 7–5, 1–6, 6–3
 It was Kafelnikov's 2nd singles title of the year and the 9th of his career.

Doubles

 Yevgeny Kafelnikov /  Daniel Vacek defeated  Luis Lobo /  Javier Sánchez 6–3, 6–7, 6–3
 It was Kafelnikov's 3rd title of the year and the 11th of his career. It was Vacek's 1st title of the year and the 11th of his career.

See also
 1996 Pupp Czech Open – women's tournament

References

External links
 ITF tournament edition details

Skoda Czech Open
Prague Open (1987–1999)
1996 in Czech tennis